Make-Up (stylized as MAKE—UP) was a Japanese hard rock and heavy metal band formed in 1983. The band became very famous in Japan for their work on the theme songs for the anime Saint Seiya.

History
In 1984 they performed their first show and released their first two albums: Howling Will and Straight Liner.

In 1985, they released their third album Born to Be Hard and their fourth and final album Rock Legend of Boys & Girls.

In 1986, the band was invited by Nippon Columbia to sing the Saint Seiya theme songs "Pegasus Fantasy" and "Blue Forever". "Pegasus Fantasy" came to be one of the most well-known anime opening songs of all time.

After the Saint Seiya: Hit Kyokushū I soundtrack album, the band split up and each member followed their own solo careers.

In 2004, Nippon Columbia released Memories of Blues: Make-Up 20th Anniversary, a box that included five CDs and a live DVD, but no new songs were recorded.

Band members
 Nobuo Yamada (山田信夫 Yamada Nobuo)
 Hiroaki Matsuzawa (松澤 浩明 Matsuzawa Hiroaki) - Guitar
 Yasuyoshi Ikeda (池田 育義 Ikeda Yasuyoshi) - Bass
 Yōgo Kōno (河野 陽吾 Kōno Yōgo) - Keyboards
 Yoshihiro Toyokawa (豊川 義弘 Toyokawa Yoshihiro)  - Drums

Discography
Studio albums
Howling Will (April 1, 1984)
Straight Linet (October 21, 1984)
Born to Be Hard (May 21, 1985)
Rock Legend of Boys & Girls (December 21, 1985)

EPs
The Voice from Yesterday (December 12, 2009)

Joint albums
Rock Joint Bazzar with Grand Prix (March 21, 1993)

Compilation albums
Glory Days: Make-Up Best Collection (August 1, 1989)
Memories of Blues: Make-Up 20th Anniversary (December 1, 2004)
Golden: Best of Make-Up (October 31, 2012)

Soundtrack albums
Saint Seiya: Hit Kyokushū I with Mitsuko Horie (December 21, 1986)
Saint Seiya '96: Song Collection (March 20, 1996)
Saint Seiya: Complete Song Collection with various artists (November 21, 2002)

References

External links
Make-Up20周年記念BOX | Memories of Blue 
Make-Up on Anison Database 

Japanese heavy metal musical groups
Japanese hard rock musical groups